Auvillars-sur-Saône (literally Auvillars on Saône) is a commune in the Côte-d'Or department in the Bourgogne-Franche-Comté region of eastern France.

The inhabitants of the commune are known as Auvillerois or Auvilleroises.

Geography
Auvillars-sur-Saône is located some 14 km south-east of Nuits-Saint-Georges and 20 km east by north-east of Beaune. Access to the commune is by the D996 road from Corcelles-lès-Cîteaux in the north which passes south down the western side of the commune to Pouilly-sur-Saône. The D35A branches off the D996 in the commune and goes to the village then continues south to Glanon. The D20 branches west off the D996 and goes to Bagnot. Apart from the village there is the hamlet of Auvillars in the south. Apart from patches of forest in the centre of the commune the land is all farmland.

The Saône river forms the eastern boundary of the commune as it flows south to eventually join the Rhône at Lyon. The Raie du Lac flows south through the centre of the commune to join the Saône.

Neighbouring communes and villages

History
The Chateau was built in 1409 by Jean de Saint-Hilaire and damaged in 1636 by the troops of Matthias Gallas.

Heraldry

Administration

List of Successive Mayors

Demography
In 2017 the commune had 331 inhabitants.

Culture and heritage

Civil heritage
The commune has a number of buildings and structures that are registered as historical monuments:

A Lavoir (Public laundry) (19th century)
A Farmhouse at CR 11 (19th century)
A Manor House at CR 14 (18th century)
A Farmhouse at CR 21 (19th century)
A School at CR 21 (1876)
The Town Hall at CR 21 (19th century)
A Farmhouse at CR 4 (18th century)
A Farmhouse at Rue Corné (18th century)
A Farmhouse at Rue des Creux (1817)
A Farmhouse at Rue du Creux Bâton (1) (18th century)
A Farmhouse at Rue du Creux Bâton (2) (18th century)
A Well at Rue du Creux Bâton (19th century)
A Fortified Chateau at Rue de l'Eglise (1681)
A Farmhouse at RD 996 (18th century)
A Manor House at Rue du Tertre (19th century)
Houses and Farms (18th - 19th century)

There is a house in the commune that has 2 Weathervanes (18th century) that are registered as historical objects.

Religious heritage

The commune has several religious buildings and structures that are registered as historical monuments:
A Presbytery at Rue de l'Eglise (19th century)
The Parish Church of Sainte-Madeleine at Rue de l'Eglise (15th century) The Church has a very large number of items that are registered as historical objects.
A Wayside Coss at RD 35a (1901)
An Oratory at RD 996 (16th century)
A Cemetery Cross (1844)

Environmental heritage
Because of its efforts for the quality of its nocturnal environment the commune was labeled a "2 star Village" in 2013. The label is awarded by the National Association for the Protection of the sky and night environment (ANPCEN ) and has 5 levels. A panel displayed at the entrances to the village shows this distinction.

See also
Communes of the Côte-d'Or department

References

External links
Auvillars-sur-Saône on Géoportail, National Geographic Institute (IGN) website 
Auvillars on the 1750 Cassini Map

Communes of Côte-d'Or